Realer 2 is a mixtape by American rapper YoungBoy Never Broke Again. It was released through Never Broke Again and Atlantic Records on September 6, 2022. The mixtape features a guest appearance from the mother of YoungBoy's child, Jaz. The mixtape is a sequel to YoungBoy's December 2018 mixtape, Realer. YoungBoy's in-house producer Jason "Cheese" Goldberg mixed, mastered, and engineered every track on the mixtape. The album also features production from many prestigious producers such as Daysix, D-Roc, Drum Dummie, Jason "Cheese" Goldberg, Khris James, London on da Track, and TnTXD.

Release and promotion
On September 4, 2022, YoungBoy released the promotional single, "Purge Me", alongside the official music video, exclusively to his YouTube channel. On September 5, 2022, the mixtape was first teased by YoungBoy's mother Sherhonda Gaulden via an Instagram story where she simply wrote "Realer 2 mixtape tonight." Again confirmed to be released on the night of September 5, 2022, DJ Akademiks:

Despite all of the confirmations, the mixtape did not release as planned on September 5, 2022. However, on September 6, 2022, YoungBoy randomly released the mixtape exclusively to his YouTube. It was later distributed to all digital streaming platforms by Atlantic Records on behalf of Never Broke Again on September 7, 2022.

Critical reception

Realer 2 received mixed reviews from music critics. Paul Simpson from AllMusic compares Realer 2 to YoungBoy's previous album The Last Slimeto as "relatively low-key," referring to the majority of the tracks as "aggressive, unhinged ragers or more introspective cuts." Simpson suggests that the project is a throwaway as he says, "YoungBoy doesn't do much on this release that he hasn't already done several times before."

Commercial performance
Realer 2 debuted at number 71 on the US Billboard 200 after a three-day period of tracking, with 12,000 album-equivalent units in its first week. The mixtape peaked at number six on the chart, earning an additional 39,000 units. This became YoungBoy's eleventh US top-ten charting project, and the fourth of 2022, making him the only artist to chart four projects in the top ten in 2022.

Track listing

Personnel
Credits adapted from Tidal.

 Jason "Cheese" Goldberg – mastering, mixing, recording 1-15

Charts

Weekly charts

Year-end charts

References

2022 mixtape albums
YoungBoy Never Broke Again albums
Atlantic Records albums